Lee High School is the name of several high schools in the United States:

 Lee High School (Huntsville, Alabama)
 Lee High School (Arkansas)
 Lee High School (Massachusetts)
 Lee High School (Wyoming, Michigan)
 Lee High School (Lee County, Virginia)

See also
 Lee County High School (disambiguation)
 Robert E. Lee High School (disambiguation)
 Robert Lee High School, Robert Lee, Texas
 Southern Lee High School, Sanford, North Carolina
 Upson-Lee High School, Thomaston, Georgia
 Washington-Lee High School, Arlington, Virginia